WWJX (channel 23) is a religious television station in Jackson, Mississippi, United States, owned and operated by Tri-State Christian Television (TCT). The station's transmitter is located in Hinds County, Mississippi, between Crystal Springs and Terry.

Although WWJX is licensed as a full-power station, its broadcast range is comparable to that of a low-power station, thus being limited to the immediate Jackson area. Therefore, it relies on cable and satellite carriage to reach the entire market.

History
The station was granted a construction permit by the Federal Communications Commission (FCC) on August 24, 2006. WWJX officially began broadcasting in July 2009.

On May 28, 2020, Flinn Broadcasting Corporation announced that it would sell WWJX, along with sister stations KCWV in Duluth, Minnesota, WBIH in Selma, Alabama, and WFBD in Destin, Florida, to Marion, Illinois–based Tri-State Christian Television for an undisclosed price pending FCC approval; once the sale closes (which is expected to happen in late summer or early fall of 2020), the station would become an owned-and-operated station of the TCT network and the second religious television station in the Jackson area (religious programming has been offered by WRBJ-TV when Roberts Broadcasting sold that station to the Trinity Broadcasting Network in 2013).) In addition, WWJX became a sister station to WFXW in Greenville, Mississippi (which would end up donated by John Wagner to TCT prior to the closing on June 12, 2020).

On September 17, 2020, WWJX made the switch to the TCT Network.

Subchannels
The station's digital signal is multiplexed:

References

External links

Television channels and stations established in 2009
WJX
Tri-State Christian Television affiliates
Quest (American TV network) affiliates
Twist (TV network) affiliates
TrueReal affiliates
Scripps News affiliates